Yehoshua Rabinovitz (12 November 1911 – 14 August 1979) was an Israeli politician who served as a government minister and mayor of Tel Aviv.

Biography
Born in Vishneva in the Russian Empire (today in Belarus), Rabinovitz attended high school in Vilnius, and went on to train as a teacher in the same city. He worked as a teacher and headmaster, and was a member of the HeHalutz movement. He made aliyah to the Mandate Palestine in 1934 and studied in the economics and law school of Tel Aviv University. Prior to independence, he worked for Hamashbir Lazarchan, and was involved in the Haganah.

In 1955 he was elected onto Tel Aviv city council, serving until 1959. That year he became Deputy Mayor in charge of Finances, a position he held until becoming mayor in 1969. He served as mayor until 1974.

Although not a member of the Knesset, he was appointed Minister of Housing in March 1974 by Golda Meir. After Meir resigned, he became Minister of Finance in Yitzhak Rabin's government, serving until 1977. In the 1977 elections he was voted into the Knesset on the Alignment's list, but lost his cabinet post as Likud formed a right-wing government. His seat was taken by Esther Herlitz.

While attending the funeral of David Horowitz in August 1979, Rabinovitz suffered a heart attack and died from it soon after.

Commemoration
Yarkon Park in Tel Aviv, officially named "Ganei Yehoshua," is named for him.

References

1911 births
1979 deaths
People from Valozhyn District
People from Oshmyansky Uyezd
Belarusian Jews
Polish emigrants to Mandatory Palestine
Jews in Mandatory Palestine
Jewish Israeli politicians
Israeli people of Belarusian-Jewish descent
Alignment (Israel) politicians
Ministers of Finance of Israel
Ministers of Housing of Israel
Members of the 9th Knesset (1977–1981)
Mayors of Tel Aviv-Yafo
Deputy Mayors of Tel Aviv-Yafo
Haganah members
Tel Aviv University alumni
Burials at Trumpeldor Cemetery